Maurolicus mucronatus is a species of ray-finned fish in the genus Maurolicus. It is found in the Western Indian Ocean.

References 

Sternoptychidae
Fish described in 1871